Opogona fumiceps is a moth of the family Tineidae first described by Felder in 1875. It is found in Sri Lanka and India.

References

Moths of Asia
Moths described in 1875
Tineidae
Hieroxestinae